Davudi-ye Olya (also Romanized as Dāvūdī-ye ‘Olyā; also known as Dāvūdī-ye Bālā) is a village in Howmeh Rural District, in the Central District of Harsin County, Kermanshah Province, Iran. At the 2006 census, its population was 44, in 7 families.

References 

Populated places in Harsin County